Gornji Grad (literally, 'upper castle' or 'upper town') may refer to:

 Gornji Grad, Gornji Grad, a settlement in Slovenia and the eponym of the Municipality of Gornji Grad
 Gornji Grad, Zagreb, a historic district of the Croatian capital, also known as Gradec, and the eponym of the modern-day district of Gornji Grad–Medveščak
 Gornji Grad, Osijek, a city district of Osijek, Croatia
 Gornji Grad, Zemun, an urban neighborhood of Belgrade, Serbia

See also 
 Donji Grad (disambiguation)
 Novi Grad (disambiguation)
 Stari Grad (disambiguation)
 Grad (toponymy)